Damir Martin (born 14 July 1988) is a Croatian rower. He won silver in the men's single scull at the 2016 Olympics losing to Mahé Drysdale in a photo finish and beating the multiple time world champion Ondřej Synek.  He also won silver at the 2012 Olympics in the quadruple scull together with David Šain, Martin Sinković and Valent Sinković. At the 2020 Tokyo Olympics held in 2021 he won a bronze medal after an amazing finish.

Martin began rowing at the age of 12.  He has been part of the Croatian national team since the age of 17.  Rowing is a sporting tradition in his home town of Vukovar.  His grandfather was a rower too. His parents even met through their rowing club.  He took up rowing after the family moved to Zagreb, in the rowing club "Zagreb", than went to rowing club "Trešnjevka" and is now in the rowing club "Croatia"   At just the age of 3 he had to leave his hometown of Vukovar with his mother Dubravka and older brother Stanislav because of the war, while his father Boris stayed and fought.

References
Notes

Bibliography

 

1988 births
Living people
Croatian male rowers
Sportspeople from Vukovar
Rowers at the 2012 Summer Olympics
Rowers at the 2016 Summer Olympics
Rowers at the 2020 Summer Olympics
Olympic rowers of Croatia
Olympic silver medalists for Croatia
Olympic bronze medalists for Croatia
Olympic medalists in rowing
Medalists at the 2012 Summer Olympics
Medalists at the 2016 Summer Olympics
Medalists at the 2020 Summer Olympics
World Rowing Championships medalists for Croatia
European Rowing Championships medalists